Coolspring Township or Cool Spring Township may refer to:

 Coolspring Township, LaPorte County, Indiana
 Coolspring Township, Mercer County, Pennsylvania
 Cool Spring Township, Rutherford County, North Carolina, in Rutherford County, North Carolina

See also 
 Cool Springs Township, Iredell County, North Carolina

Township name disambiguation pages